The Chery Arrizo M7 is a compact MPV produced by the Chinese manufacturer Chery Automobile.

History 

The Chery Arrizo M7 is essentially a facelift of the previously sold Chery V5 (Eastar Cross) with the majority of body panels carried over with only the front and rear bumpers, front fenders and hood, rear glass, and front and rear light units redesigned.

In December 2013, spyshots suggested that the car would be called Chery V5.

In August 2014, spyshots suggested that the car would be called Chery Fulwin 8.

The Chery Arrizo M7 made its world debut in Malaysia as the Chery Maxime where it was launched in January 2015 with two variants: Standard and Premium. In April 2015, during the Auto Shanghai 2015, the Chery Arrizo M7 was launched in China.

References

External links 
 Chery Arrizo M7 International Site
 Chery Maxime Malaysian Site

  iran  Site

Compact MPVs
Arrizo M7
Cars introduced in 2015
Cars of China